Valdas Kazlauskas (born 23 February 1958 in Vilnius, Lithuanian Soviet Socialist Republic) is a retired male racewalker and athletics coach from Lithuania. He competed for his native Baltic country at the 1996 Summer Olympics in Atlanta, Georgia, finishing in 44th place (1:28.33) in the men's 20 km race walk event. Kazlauskas set his personal best (1:19.29) in the same distance on 19 February 1989 in Sochi. Valdas Kazlauskas achieved the World and European Record for the 20 km Race Walking with the performance of 1:20:37 on the 16 September 1983 in Moscow. Valdas Kazlasukas reached 27 national records, 1 European record and 3 world records.

Achievements

References

 
 Lithuanian sport encyclopedia

External links
 
 
 

1958 births
Living people
Soviet male racewalkers
Lithuanian male racewalkers
Lithuanian athletics coaches
Olympic athletes of Lithuania
Athletes (track and field) at the 1996 Summer Olympics
World record setters in athletics (track and field)
Sportspeople from Vilnius